Time to Grow is the second studio album by English singer Lemar. It was released by Sony BMG on 29 November 2004 in the United Kingdom. The album has been certified double platinum by the British Phonographic Industry (BPI).

Critical reception

Caroline Sullivan from The Guardian found that after "a dismissable first album," Time to Grow "will divest [Lemar] of the reality-TV albatross. The single "If There's Any Justice" [...] is a yearning piece of trad-soul that gives the rest of the album something to live up to. By and large, it does." AllMusic rated the album four stars out of five.

Track listing

Charts

Weekly charts

Year-end charts

Certifications

References

2004 albums
Lemar albums
RCA Records albums
Albums produced by Brian McKnight